Sunbeam is the fifth studio album of the girl group The Emotions issued in April 1978 on Columbia Records. The album rose to No. 12 on the Billboard Top Soul Albums chart and No. 40 on the Billboard 200 chart.  Sunbeam has also been certified Gold in the US by the RIAA.

Critical reception

John Storm Roberts of High Fidelity stated ""Sunbeam" sparkles with good tracks."
Craig Lytle of Allmusic gave a 3 out of 5 stars rating and found that "As White's signature can be detected throughout most of the compositions, he is humble enough to leave room for the Emotions to flourish vocally." Phyl Garland of Stereo Review exclaimed "'Sunbeam' is from the same mold as 'Rejoice'-and a very good mold it is-though the outcome here falls just a bit short of the previous opus." Garland also called Sunbeam a "very good" recording with a "polished, but not slick" performance by The Emotions. Glenn Clark of The Morning Call wrote "The best thing I can say about this LP is that I like it. The Emotions' brand of snappy and upbeat soul is good for my soul. Maurice White, guru of Earth, Wind & Fire, produced this album, and I think he has blended well the talent he has brought together."

Track listing

Personnel
The Emotions
 Wanda Hutchinson – vocals
 Sheila Hutchinson Whitt – vocals
 Jeanette Hawes – vocals

Musicians
 Terry L. Mashall, Skip Scarborough – keyboards
 Charles "Chuck-A-Luck" Hosch, Gary Grainger, Verdine White – bass 
 Keith Henderson, Marlo Henderson, Jon Lind, Al McKay – guitars
 Donzell Davis, Fred White, Maurice White – drums 
 Paulinho da Costa, Earl DeRouen – percussion
 Victor Feldman – vibes
 Oscar Brashear, Rahm Lee Davis, Chuck Findley, Michael Harris – trumpets
 George Bohanon, Louis Satterfield, Maurice Spears – trombones
 Barbara Korn, Sidney Muldrow, Alan Robinson, Gale Robinson, Marilyn Robinson – French horns
 Donald Myrick, George Patterson, Jr. – saxophones
 Murray Adler, Harry Bluestone, Ron Clark, Assa Drori, Ronald Folsom, Frank Foster, Janice Gower, Endre Granat, William Henderson, Davida Lou Johnson, Bernard Kundrell, Joseph Livoti, Joy Lyle, Stanley Plummer, Nathan Ross, Sheldon Sanov, Ilkka Talvi – violins
 Samuel Boghossian, Denyce Buffum, Gareth Nuttycombe – violas
 Armand Kaproff, Dennis Karmazyn, Raymond Kelley – cellos
 Tom Tom 84 (Thomas Washington) - horn and string arrangements

Technical
Tom Perry - engineer
Andy Engel - album design
Jürgen Reisch - photography

Charts

Singles

References

External links
Sunbeam at Discogs

1978 albums
Columbia Records albums
The Emotions albums
Albums produced by Maurice White
Albums recorded at Sunset Sound Recorders